Leptoria is a genus of stony corals in the family Merulinidae. Members of this genus are known as brain corals or closed brain corals. They are native to the Indo-Pacific region and their ranges extend from the Red Sea through the Indian Ocean as far as Japan and the South Central Pacific Ocean.

Characteristics
Colonies are massive and the corallites are meandroid (in meandering valleys on the surface of the coral). The septa are neatly arranged like rungs on a ladder.

Species 
The following species are currently recognized by the World Register of Marine Species :

 Leptoria irregularis  Veron, 1990
 Leptoria phrygia  (Ellis & Solander, 1786)

References 

Merulinidae
Scleractinia genera